Haslam is a surname originating in England since the Anglo Saxons. One source says it originated from a village in Lancashire that doesn't exist anymore called Haesel-hamm which is Old English for Hazel-Wood Farm. Another is Hasland in Derbyshire, which made sense because records does show the surname originated from the county before emigrating to Oxfordshire in the 15th century and later to Lancashire where the surname is most common, strongly around Bolton.. Haslam began appearing in Ireland after Oliver Cromwell's conquest in the mid-17th century, and in the early 19th century have emigrated to Canada and the United States, mostly around Maryland and Pennsylvania before later moving to Tennessee and the west coast. Convicts with Haslam around that time were sent to Tasmania and New South Wales in Australia, and later immigrants arrived in Adelaide, South Australia and New Zealand.

Notable people
 Alfred Seale Haslam  (1844–1927), knight, engineer, mayor of Derby
 Alex Haslam, British psychologist
 Annie Haslam, singer and songwriter
 Bill Haslam, former governor of the state of Tennessee
 Chris Haslam (skateboarder), skateboarder
 Dave Haslam, author and DJ
 David Haslam (GP), past chair of the Royal College of General Practitioners
 David W Haslam, Royal Navy hydrographer
 Edwin Haslam, physical organic chemist and author
 Fred Haslam (game designer), game designer
 Fred Haslam (footballer), English footballer
 George Haslam (footballer), English footballer
 Gerald Haslam, author
 Harry Haslam (footballer, born 1921) (1921–1986)
 Henry Haslam (footballer), British footballer
 James Haslam Jr., businessman and philanthropist of Knoxville, Tennessee
 Jonathan Haslam, Professor of the History of International Relations, Institute for Advanced Study
 John Haslam (1764–1844), British physician known for his writings on mental illness
 Juliet Haslam, Australian field hockey player
 Karen Haslam, Canadian politician
 Leon Haslam, motorcycle racer, son of Ron
 Lewis Haslam, (born 2001), rapper by the name of Mar Gotti
 LuAnn Haslam, American child actress
 Mark Haslam (born 1972), New Zealand cricketer
 Nicholas Haslam, society interior designer, columnist, and bon viveur
 Robert Haslam (Pony Express) (1840–1912), Pony Express rider
 Radeem Haslam, Jamaican record producer and businessman
 Robert Haslam (industrialist) (1923–2002), chairman of British Coal and British Steel
 Ron Haslam, motorcycle roadracer
 Udonis Haslem, American basketball player
 William Haslam (1850–1898), South Australian politician
 Jorge Guillermo Borges Haslam (1874 – 1938), Argentine lawyer, teacher and philosopher, also notable for being Jorge Luis Borges's father
 Yusof Haslam , Malaysian film director

See also
Haslem, surname

Surnames of English origin